Thessaloniki Concert Hall is a centre for the performing arts in Thessaloniki, Greece. It opened in 2000 on land donated by the Greek state. The complex has two main buildings: M1, with an auditorium that seats 1400; and M2, in more contemporary style by Japanese architect Arata Isozaki, with a number of smaller performance spaces.

Artistic director of the Thessaloniki Concert Hall, whose three-year term begins on January 1, 2021, is Christos Galileas, associate professor of violin at Georgia State University.

See also
 Municipal Theatre of Corfu
 Athens Concert Hall
 List of concert halls

References

External links
 Homepage

Modernist architecture in Greece
Eclectic architecture in Greece
Buildings and structures in Thessaloniki
Music venues in Greece
Opera houses in Greece
2000 establishments in Greece
Tourist attractions in Thessaloniki
Music venues completed in 2000
Music in Thessaloniki